The Mausoleum at Halicarnassus or Tomb of Mausolus was a tomb built between 353 and 350 BC in Halicarnassus (present Bodrum, Turkey) for Mausolus, an Anatolian from Caria and a satrap in the Achaemenid Empire, and his sister-wife Artemisia II of Caria. The structure was designed by the Greek architects Satyros and Pythius of Priene. Its elevated tomb structure is derived from the tombs of neighbouring Lycia, a territory Mausolus had invaded and annexed c. 360 BC, such as the Nereid Monument.

The Mausoleum contained total 400 freestanding sculptures. The mausoleum was considered to be such an aesthetic triumph that Antipater of Sidon identified it as one of his Seven Wonders of the Ancient World. It was destroyed by successive earthquakes from the 12th to the 15th century; it was the last surviving of the six destroyed wonders.

The word mausoleum has now come to be used generically for an above-ground tomb.

Conquest
In the 4th century BC, Halicarnassus was the capital of a small regional kingdom of Caria within the Achaemenid Empire on the western coast of Asia Minor.

In 377 BC, the nominal ruler of the region, Hecatomnus of Milas, died and left control of the kingdom to his son, Mausolus. Hecatomnus, a local dynast under the Persians, took control of several of the neighboring cities and districts. After Artemisia and Mausolus, he had several other daughters and sons: Ada (adoptive mother of Alexander the Great), Idrieus, and Pixodarus. Mausolus extended his territory as far as the southwest coast of Anatolia, invading, in particular, the territory of Lycia, remarkable for its numerous monumental tombs such as the Tombs at Xanthos, from which he took his inspiration for his mausoleum.

Artemisia and Mausolus ruled from Halicarnassus over the surrounding territory for 24 years. Mausolus, although descended from local people, spoke Greek and admired the Greek way of life and government. He founded many cities of Greek design along the coast and encouraged Greek democratic traditions.

Mausolus decided to build a new capital, one as safe from capture as it was magnificent to be seen. He chose the city of Halicarnassus. Artemisia and Mausolus spent huge amounts of tax money to embellish the city. They commissioned statues, temples and buildings of gleaming marble. In 353 BC, Mausolus died, leaving Artemisia to rule alone. As the Persian satrap, and as the Hecatomnid dynast, Mausolus had planned for himself an elaborate tomb. When he died the project was continued by his siblings. The tomb became so famous that Mausolus's name is now the eponym for all stately tombs, in the word mausoleum.

Artemisia lived for only two years after the death of her husband. The urns with their ashes were placed in the yet unfinished tomb. As a form of sacrifice, the bodies of a large number of dead animals were placed on the stairs leading to the tomb, and then the stairs were filled with stones and rubble, sealing the access. According to the historian Pliny the Elder, the craftsmen decided to stay and finish the work after the death of their patron "considering that it was at once a memorial of his own fame and of the sculptor's art''.

Construction of the Mausoleum

It is likely that Mausolus started to plan the tomb before his death, as part of the building works in Halicarnassus, so that when he died, Artemisia continued the building project. Artemisia spared no expense in building the tomb. She sent messengers to Greece to find the most talented artists of the time. These included Scopas, the man who had supervised the rebuilding of the Temple of Artemis at Ephesus. The famous sculptors were (in the Vitruvius order): Leochares, Bryaxis, Scopas, and Timotheus, as well as hundreds of other craftsmen.

The tomb was erected on a hill overlooking the city. The whole structure sat in an enclosed courtyard. At the center of the courtyard was a stone platform on which the tomb sat. A stairway flanked by stone lions led to the top of the platform, which bore along its outer walls many statues of gods and goddesses. At each corner, stone warriors mounted on horseback guarded the tomb. At the center of the platform, the marble tomb rose as a square tapering block to one-third of the Mausoleum's  height. This section was covered with bas-reliefs showing action scenes, including the battle of the centaurs with the lapiths and Greeks in combat with the Amazons, a race of warrior women.

On the top of this section of the tomb thirty-six slim columns, ten per side, with each corner sharing one column between two sides; rose for another third of the height. Standing between each pair of columns was a statue. Behind the columns was a solid cella-like block that carried the weight of the tomb's massive roof. The roof, which comprised most of the final third of the height, was pyramidal. Perched on the top was a quadriga: four massive horses pulling a chariot in which rode images of Mausolus and Artemisia.

History

Modern historians have pointed out that two years would not be enough time to decorate and build such a complex and extravagant building. Therefore, it is believed that construction was begun by Mausolus before his death or continued by the next leaders. The Mausoleum of Halicarnassus resembled a temple and the only way to tell the difference was its slightly higher outer walls. The Mausoleum was in the Greek-dominated area of Halicarnassus, which in 353 was controlled by the Achaemenid Empire. According to the Roman architect Vitruvius, it was built by Satyros and Pytheus who wrote a treatise about it; this treatise is now lost. Pausanias adds that the Romans considered the Mausoleum one of the greatest wonders of the world and it was for that reason that they called all their magnificent tombs mausolea, after it.

It is unknown exactly when and how the Mausoleum came to ruin: Eustathius, writing in the 12th century on his commentary of the Iliad, says "it was and is a wonder". Because of this, Fergusson concluded that the building was ruined, probably by an earthquake, between this period and 1402, when the Knights of St John of Jerusalem arrived and recorded that it was in ruins. However, Luttrell notes that at that time the local Greeks and Turks had no name for – or legends to account for – the colossal ruins, suggesting a destruction at a much earlier period.

Many of the stones from the ruins were used by the knights to fortify their castle at Bodrum; they also recovered bas-reliefs with which they decorated the new building. Much of the marble was burned into lime. In 1846, Lord Stratford de Redcliffe obtained permission to remove these reliefs from the Bodrum.

At the original site, all that remained by the 19th century were the foundations and some broken sculptures. This site was originally indicated by Professor Donaldson and was discovered definitively by Charles Newton, after which an expedition was sent by the British government. The expedition lasted three years and ended in the sending of the remaining marbles. At some point before or after this, grave robbers broke into and destroyed the underground burial chamber, but in 1972, there was still enough of it remaining to determine a layout of the chambers when they were excavated.

This monument was ranked the seventh wonder of the world by the ancients, not because of its size or strength but because of the beauty of its design and how it was decorated with sculpture or ornaments. The mausoleum was Halicarnassus' principal architectural monument, standing in a dominant position on rising ground above the harbor.

Jar of Xerxes I

A jar in calcite or alabaster, an alabastron, with the quadrilingual signature of Achaemenid ruler Xerxes I (ruled 486–465 BC) was discovered in the ruins of the Mausoleum, at the foot of the western staircase. The vase contains an inscription in Old Persian, Egyptian, Babylonian, and Elamite:

Such jars, of Egyptian origin, were very precious to the Achaemenids, and may therefore have been offered by Xerxes to Carian rulers, and then kept as a precious object. In particular, the precious jar may have been offered by Xerxes to the Carian dynast Artemisia I, who had acted with merit as his only female Admiral during the Second Persian invasion of Greece, and particularly at the Battle of Salamis. The jar testifies to the close contacts between Carian rulers and the Achaemenid Empire.

Dimensions and statues

Much of the information that has been gathered about the Mausoleum and its structure has come from the Roman polymath Pliny the Elder.  He wrote some basic facts about the architecture and some dimensions. The building was rectangular, not square, surrounded by a colonnade of thirty-six columns. There was a pyramidal superstructure receding in twenty-four steps to the summit. On top there were 4 horse chariots of marble. The building was accented with both sculptural friezes and free-standing figures. "The free standing figures were arranged on 5 or 6 different levels." 

We are now able to justify that Pliny's knowledge came from a work written by the architect. It is clear that Pliny did not grasp the design of the mausoleum fully which creates problems in recreating the structure. He does state many facts which help the reader recreate pieces of the puzzle. Other writings by Pausanias, Strabo, and Vitruvius also help us to gather more information about the Mausoleum.

It was surrounded by 36 columns. They called this part the pteron. Above the pteron there was a pyramid on top with 24 steps and equal in height to the lower part.

The only other author that gives the dimensions of the Mausoleum is Hyginus a grammarian in the time of Augustus. He likely meant cubits which would match Pliny's dimensions exactly but this text is largely considered corrupt and is of little importance. We learn from Vitruvius that Satyros and Phytheus wrote a description of their work which Pliny likely read. Pliny likely wrote down these dimensions without thinking about the form of the building.

Another important find was the depth on the rock on which the building stood.
The sculptures on the north were created by Scopas, the ones on the east Bryaxis, on the south Timotheus and on the west Leochares.

The Mausoleum was adorned with many great and beautiful sculptures. Some of these sculptures have been lost or only fragments have been found. Several of the statues' original placements are only known through historical accounts. The great figures of Mausolus and Artemisia stood in the chariot at the top of the pyramid. The detached equestrian groups are placed at the corners of the sub-podium. The semi-colossal female heads may have belonged to the acroteria of the two gables which may have represented the six Carian towns incorporated in Halicarnassus. Work still continues today as groups continue to excavate and research the mausoleum's art.

Later history of the Mausoleum

The Mausoleum overlooked the city of Halicarnassus for many years. It was untouched when the city fell to Alexander the Great in 334 BC and still undamaged after attacks by pirates in 62 and 58 BC. It stood above the city's ruins for sixteen centuries. Then a series of earthquakes shattered the columns and sent the bronze chariot crashing to the ground. By AD 1404, only the base of the Mausoleum was still recognizable.

The Knights of St John of Rhodes invaded the region and built Bodrum Castle (Castle of Saint Peter). When they decided to fortify it in 1494, they used the stones of the Mausoleum. This is also about when "imaginative reconstructions" of the Mausoleum began to appear. In 1522, rumours of a Turkish invasion caused the Crusaders to strengthen the castle at Halicarnassus (which was by then known as Bodrum) and much of the remaining portions of the tomb were broken up and used in the castle walls. Sections of polished marble from the tomb can still be seen there today. Suleiman the Magnificent conquered the base of the knights on the island of Rhodes, who then relocated first briefly to Sicily and later permanently to Malta, leaving the Castle and Bodrum to the Ottoman Empire.

During the fortification work, a party of knights entered the base of the monument and discovered the room containing a great coffin. In many histories of the Mausoleum one can find the following story of what happened: the party, deciding it was too late to open it that day, returned the next morning to find the tomb, and any treasure it may have contained, plundered. The bodies of Mausolus and Artemisia were missing too. The small museum building next to the site of the Mausoleum tells the story. Research done by archeologists in the 1960s shows that long before the knights came, grave robbers had dug a tunnel under the grave chamber, stealing its contents. Also, the museum states that it is most likely that Mausolus and Artemisia were cremated, so only an urn with their ashes was placed in the grave chamber. This explains why no bodies were found.

Before grinding and burning much of the remaining sculpture of the Mausoleum into lime for plaster, the Knights removed several of the best works and mounted them in the Bodrum castle. There they stayed for three centuries.

Discovery and excavation

In the 19th century, a British consul obtained several of the statues from Bodrum Castle; these now reside in the British Museum. In 1852, the British Museum sent the archaeologist Charles Thomas Newton to search for more remains of the Mausoleum. He had a difficult job. He did not know the exact location of the tomb, and the cost of buying up all the small parcels of land in the area to look for it would have been astronomical. Instead, Newton studied the accounts of ancient writers like Pliny to obtain the approximate size and location of the memorial, then bought a plot of land in the most likely location. Digging down, Newton explored the surrounding area through tunnels he dug under the surrounding plots. He was able to locate some walls, a staircase, and finally three of the corners of the foundation. With this knowledge, Newton was able to determine which plots of land he needed to buy.

Newton then excavated the site and found sections of the reliefs that decorated the wall of the building and portions of the stepped roof. Finally, he found the statues of Mausolus and Artemisia that had stood at the pinnacle of the building. These blocks were used for the construction of a new dock in Malta for the Royal Navy. Today this dock is known at Dock No. 1 in Cospicua, but the building blocks are hidden from view, submerged in Dockyard Creek in the Grand Harbour.

From 1966 to 1977, the Mausoleum was thoroughly researched by Prof. Kristian Jeppesen of Aarhus University, Denmark. He has produced a six-volume monograph, The Maussolleion at Halikarnassos.

The beauty of the Mausoleum was not only in the structure itself, but in the decorations and statues that adorned the outside at different levels on the podium and the roof: statues of people, lions, horses, and other animals in varying scales. The four Greek sculptors who carved the statues: Bryaxis, Leochares, Scopas and Timotheus were each responsible for one side. Because the statues were of people and animals, the Mausoleum holds a special place in history, as it was not dedicated to the gods of Ancient Greece.

Today, the massive castle of the Knights Hospitaller (Knights of St. John) still stands in Bodrum, and the polished stone and marble blocks of the Mausoleum can be spotted built into the walls of the structure. At the site of the Mausoleum, only the foundation remains, and a small museum. Some of the surviving sculptures at the British Museum include fragments of statues and many slabs of the frieze showing the battle between the Greeks and the Amazons. There the images of Mausolus and his queen watch over the few broken remains of the beautiful tomb she built for him.

Influence on modern architecture
Modern buildings whose designs were based upon or influenced by interpretations of the design of the Mausoleum of Mausolus include Fourth and Vine Tower in Cincinnati; the Civil Courts Building in St. Louis; the National Newark Building in Newark, New Jersey; Grant's Tomb and 26 Broadway in New York City; Los Angeles City Hall; the Shrine of Remembrance in Melbourne; the spire of St. George's Church, Bloomsbury in London; the Indiana War Memorial (and in turn Salesforce Tower) in Indianapolis; the House of the Temple in Washington D.C.; the National Diet in Tokyo; the Soldiers and Sailors Memorial Hall in Pittsburgh; and the Commerce Bank Building in Peoria, IL.

Gallery of 2nd century replica site 
In Milas (also the site of the tomb of Hecatomnus, who was the father of Mausolus), is also the site of the Gümüşkesen, a small-scale Roman-era (2nd century BC) copy of the Mausoleum at Halicarnassus:

See also
 List of tallest structures built before the 20th century

Notes

References

Sources
 Fergusson, James (1862). "The Mausoleum at Halicarnassus restored in conformity with the recently discovered remains." J. Murray, London

Further reading
 Brand, J. Rasmus, Erika Hagelberg, Gro Bjørnstad, and Sven Ahrens. 2017. Life and Death in Asia Minor in Hellenistic, Roman, and Byzantine Times: Studies In Archaeology and Bioarchaeology. Philadelphia: Oxbow Books.
 Cook, B. F., Bernard Ashmole, and Donald Emrys Strong. 2005. Relief Sculpture of the Mausoleum At Halicarnassus. Oxford: Oxford University Press.
 Dmitriev, Sviatoslav. 2005. City Government In Hellenistic and Roman Asia Minor. Oxford: Oxford University Press.
 Jeppeson, Kristian. 2002. The Maussolleion at Halikarnassos: Reports of the Danish archaeological expedition to Bodrum: The superstructure, a comparative analysis of the architectural, sculptural, and literary evidence. Vol. 5. Aarhus, Denmark: Aarhus Univ. Press.
 Steele, James, and Ersin Alok. 1992. Hellenistic Architecture In Asia Minor. London: Academy Editions.

External links

 The Tomb of Mausolus (W.R. Lethaby's reconstruction of the Mausoleum, 1908)
 Livius.org: Mausoleum of Halicarnassus

Ancient Greek tombs
Archaeological sites in the Aegean Region
Achaemenid Anatolia
Archaeology of the Achaemenid Empire
Bodrum
Buildings and structures completed in the 4th century BC
Burial sites of Middle Eastern royal families
Caria
Demolished buildings and structures in Turkey
Hecatomnid dynasty
Mausoleums in Turkey
Seven Wonders of the Ancient World
Collection of the Istanbul Archaeology Museums
Halicarnassus